Dzhumaya Mosque is located in Plovdiv, Plovdiv Province, Bulgaria. Its Turkish name is Hüdavendigâr Camii or Cuma Camii. The mosque is located in the centre of Plovdiv and was built in 1363–1364 on the site of the Sveta Petka Tarnovska Cathedral Church after the conquest of Plovdiv by the Ottoman army. During the reign of Sultan Murad I in the 15th century the old building was demolished and replaced by the modern-day mosque. It was called Ulu Dzhumaya Mosque, or Main Friday Mosque.

The mosque is large, with nine domes and a  prayer hall. There is a minaret at the northeast corner of the main façade. Interior wall paintings date to the late 18th to early 19th centuries.

2014 attack
The mosque was attacked by a mob described as "hundreds of nationalists, fascists and football hooligans" in February 2014. 120 were "detained" after the attack and four received minor sentences. The Grand Mufti of Bulgaria, Mustafa Haci, characterized the attack as a "pogrom."

See also 
 Islam in Bulgaria
 List of mosques in Bulgaria

References 

Ottoman mosques in Bulgaria
Buildings and structures in Plovdiv
Culture in Plovdiv
Mosque buildings with domes
Mosques completed in 1364
1360s establishments in the Ottoman Empire
1364 establishments in Europe
14th-century mosques
Grand mosques